The Sedona Film School (SFS), formerly the Zaki Gordon Institute for Independent Filmmaking (ZGI) is an accredited part of Yavapai College and a member of CILECT. It is located in Sedona, Arizona.

History
The school was founded in 2000 by screenwriter Dan Gordon and industry professional Stephan Schultze.

The Institute was originally named for Dan Gordon's eldest son, Zaki Gordon, an independent film maker who died at the age of 22.

In 2012, it changed its name to the Sedona Film School, in response to Gordon leaving the school.

In 2013, Yavapai College announced the temporary closure of the Sedona Film School while its curriculum was updated.  The updated program began admitting students in the Fall of 2015.

Programs
The school offers film making courses in narrative and occasionally documentary programs (If student enrollment is of sufficient numbers), and previously offered a second year advanced program in which students and faculty produce a full-length feature film.

References

External links
 Official Sedona Film School website
 Zaki Gordon Institute website
 Yavapai College : Sedona Center for Arts & Technology

Film schools in Arizona
Sedona, Arizona